Anisette, or Anis, is an anise-flavored liqueur that is consumed in most Mediterranean countries. It is colorless, and because it contains sugar, is sweeter than dry anise flavoured spirits (e.g. absinthe). The most traditional style of anisette is that produced by means of distilling aniseed, and is differentiated from those produced by simple maceration by the inclusion of the word distilled on the label. And while Pastis is a similar-tasting liqueur that is prepared in similar fashion and sometimes confused with anisette, it employs a combination of both aniseed and licorice root extracts. Sambuca is essentially an anisette of Italian origin that requires a high minimum (350g/L) sugar content.

The liqueur is often mixed with water or poured over ice cubes because of its strong flavour.

Geographical spread

Mediterranean

In the Mediterranean Basin, anise-based or liquorice-based spirits include:

 Spain: Anís del Mono ("the monkey's anisette") has been produced since 1870. The label, with a monkey holding a scroll and a bottle, was designed by Ramon Casas i Carbó. It is the anisette of choice in Malcolm Lowry's Under the Volcano. Characters in Ernest Hemingway's novel The Sun Also Rises and his short story "Hills Like White Elephants" drink and discuss Anís del Toro – "Bull's Anisette." Another type, Aguardiente de Ojén (es), gained fame abroad and is popular in New Orleans, Louisiana, especially during the Mardi Gras festivities.
 France: Anisette, made by Marie Brizard since 1755 and Pastis, made by Paul Ricard since 1932
 Greece: Ouzo
 Malta: Anisetta (zambur), made with anise and herbs.
 Italy: Sambuca
 Portugal: Licor Aniz Escarchado (crystallized)
 Turkey, Azerbaijan, Armenia, and Albania: Rakı
 Lebanon, Syria, Palestine, Israel, Jordan, and Egypt: Arak
 Algeria: Anisette Cristal

Latin America
Anise-flavoured alcohols from other parts of the world include Aguardiente from Colombia and Mexico.

Asia
Anise liqueur was also introduced to the Philippines by the Spanish, which developed into the local anisado, an anise-flavored liqueur usually made from distilled sugarcane wine. A notable variant of Filipino anisado with sugar is known as anisado Mallorca, or simply Mallorca. They are commonly used as ingredients in Filipino cuisine.

References 

Italian liqueurs
Mediterranean cuisine
Absinthe
Anise liqueurs and spirits
Spanish liqueurs
Philippine alcoholic drinks